Gerard van der Lem (born 15 November 1952) is a retired football winger from the Netherlands, who made his professional debut for FC Amsterdam on 12 August 1973 against PSV Eindhoven. He later played for Roda JC, Feyenoord Rotterdam, Sparta Rotterdam and FC Utrecht.

After his professional playing career Gerard van der Lem started his coaching career as assistant coach to world-famous coaches like Piet de Visser, Dick Advocaat and Louis van Gaal.

In his first engagement at FC Alkmaar (AZS) he was responsible coach for the amateur teams (and became Holland Champion in 1985) as well as assistant coach to Piet de Visser with the senior team. From 1986 to 1989 he was employed with FC Haarlem starting out as assistant coach to Dick Advocaat, and then following him into the position of head coach during the last year. 

Having always given great emphasis to youth development Gerard van der Lem joined Ajax Amsterdam in 1990 as Head of the Youth Development Department. After a successful year and many new impressions he was chosen to be co-coach to Louis van Gaal with the great and famous Champions League team. During this period from 1991 to 1997 one title followed the next:

3 x Dutch Champion
2 x Dutch Cup Winner
1 x Winner of the European Champions League
1 x UEFA Cup Winner
1 x Winner of the FIFA World Cup for Clubs
2 x Winner of the Dutch Super Cup

These successes did not go unseen. The next engagement of Louis van Gaal and Gerard van der Lem followed suit at equally famous Spanish Premier League club FC Barcelona. In the two seasons there Gerard van der Lem was able to achieve the titles:

2 x Spanish Premier League Champion
1 x Spanish Cup Winner
1 x Winner of the Spanish Super Cup

After his time in Spain Gerard van der Lem returned to his native Netherlands to become the head coach of FC Alkmaar again followed by one season in Japan at Oita Trinita of the J-League.

Another memorable and highly successful period followed in Saudi Arabia in his first engagement as National Coach. He and his team became for Saudi Arabia:

1 x Winner of the Gulf Cup /
1 x Winner of the Arab Cup /
Qualification to the Asian Cup

Furthermore, he was awarded "Best Coach of the Middle East"

After some time back home with Ajax Amsterdam where he worked in several positions (2002-2003, 2004–2006), he returned to the Middle East for an engagement with United Arab Emirates 1st Leaguist Al Sharjah Club in the season 2007–2008.

In 2008 Gerard van der Lem joined his fellow manager Henk ten Cate in an appointment at famous Greek club Panathinaikos.

At present Gerard van der Lem is technical director at Kayserispor, Turkey.

Statistics

Player

References
  Profile

1952 births
Living people
AZ Alkmaar managers
Dutch footballers
Dutch expatriate football managers
Dutch football managers
Association football wingers
Eredivisie players
Roda JC Kerkrade players
FC Amsterdam players
Sparta Rotterdam players
FC Utrecht players
Feyenoord players
Footballers from Amsterdam
AFC Ajax non-playing staff
Apollon Limassol FC managers
Dutch expatriate sportspeople in Greece
Dutch expatriate sportspeople in Saudi Arabia
Dutch expatriate sportspeople in the United Arab Emirates
Expatriate football managers in Cyprus
Dutch expatriate sportspeople in Cyprus
A.V.V. Zeeburgia players
Panathinaikos F.C. non-playing staff
Expatriate football managers in Saudi Arabia
Expatriate football managers in the United Arab Emirates
Saudi Arabia national football team managers
Al-Sharjah SCC managers
AZ Alkmaar non-playing staff